Yoncho Arsov (12 September 1929 – 9 November 2011) was a Bulgarian football player and manager who played as a midfielder. He was a legendаry manager for AC Omonoia, winning 7 domestic trophies in total, 3 domestic leagues and 4 domestic cups, within the 7 in total years managing  AC Omonoia.

Honours

Player
Levski Sofia
Bulgarian Cup (3): 1956, 1957, 1959

Manager
Levski Sofia
Bulgarian A Group: 1969–70
Bulgarian Cup (2): 1970, 1971

Omonia
Cypriot First Division (3): 1986–87, 1988–89, 1992–93
Cypriot Cup (4): 1980, 1988, 1994, 2000

References

External links 
Levski Sofia career summary

1929 births
2011 deaths
Bulgarian footballers
Bulgaria international footballers
First Professional Football League (Bulgaria) players
PFC Levski Sofia players
Bulgarian football managers
PFC Levski Sofia managers
AC Omonia managers
Bulgarian expatriate football managers
Expatriate football managers in Cyprus
Bulgarian expatriate sportspeople in Cyprus
Footballers from Sofia
Association football midfielders